Fort Ingall was originally a British fieldwork built in Cabano, Quebec, Canada in 1839 for the Aroostook War between Great Britain and the United States of America.

The site now features a reconstructed 19th-century fort museum containing exhibits about the fort's history and the Aroostook War, as well as artifacts recovered from the site.  In season, guided tours demonstrate the soldiers' lives during that time.

History
In 1839, Lt. Frederick Lenox Ingall was ordered to build a fieldwork on the Lake Temiscouata. In the summer, three barracks, one for the officers, and two for the men were erected near the Lake, at the end of the road from Riviere-du-Loup. A small detachment of the 24th Regiment of Foot arrived in the summer. The detachment consisted of only 12 men with their 6 wives and 11 children. In the following years, the original small fieldwork became a fortified fort of 12 barracks surrounded by a 12-foot stockade. Three other Regiments occupied the Fort between 1839 and 1841, the 11th, the 56th and the 68th of Foot, in order, with a maximum occupation of 200 men.

In 1842, the treaty of Webster-Ashburton settled the boundary, thereby ending the war.

According to local oral tradition, the Fort was demolished by the first inhabitants of Cabano in the 1900s, who used the large wood logs to build their houses. By the 1920s, nothing remained of the Fort.

Bt the 1950s, the Fort was almost forgotten, relegated to a legend, until the archeological excavations of the 60s. In 1972, the Fort was reconstructed to its original dimensions, using 19th-century construction techniques.

Fort Ingall is now owned by a non-profit organization, the Historical and Archeological Society of Temiscouata.

See also
 List of forts

References

 Fort Ingall brochure, undated, Parks Canada.

External links

 Official website

Military and war museums in Canada
Museums in Bas-Saint-Laurent
Ingall
Buildings and structures in Bas-Saint-Laurent
Heritage sites in Quebec (Cultural Heritage Act)